George Quentin Daley is the Dean of the Faculty of Medicine, Caroline Shields Walker Professor of Medicine, and Professor of Biological Chemistry and Molecular Pharmacology at Harvard Medical School. He was formerly the Robert A. Stranahan Professor of Pediatrics at Harvard Medical School, Director of the Stem Cell Transplantation Program at Boston Children's Hospital, and an investigator of the Howard Hughes Medical Institute, Associate Director of Children's Stem Cell Program, a member of the Executive Committee of the Harvard Stem Cell Institute.  He is a past president of the International Society for Stem Cell Research (2007–2008).

Early life and education
Daley was born in Catskill, New York.

Daley received his Bachelor of Arts magna cum laude from Harvard College (1982), his PhD in biology from MIT (1989), and his MD from Harvard Medical School, where he was the twelfth individual in the school's history to be awarded the degree summa cum laude (1991). He served as Chief Resident in Internal Medicine at the Massachusetts General Hospital and is currently a staff physician in Hematology/Oncology at Boston Children's Hospital and Dana–Farber Cancer Institute.

As a graduate student working with Nobelist Dr. David Baltimore, Dr. Daley demonstrated that the BCR/ABL oncogene induces chronic myeloid leukemia (CML) in a mouse model, which validated BCR/ABL as a target for drug blockade and encouraged the development of imatinib (Gleevec; Novartis), a magic-bullet chemotherapy that induces remissions in virtually every CML patient.  Daley's studies have clarified mechanisms of Gleevec resistance and informed novel combination chemotherapeutic regimens.

Research
Daley's research seeks to translate insights in stem cell biology into improved therapies for genetic and malignant diseases. His laboratory has pioneered human cell culture-based and murine models of human blood disease and cancer. Important research contributions from his laboratory include the creation of customized stem cells to treat genetic immune deficiency in a mouse model (together with Rudolf Jaenisch), the differentiation of germ cells from embryonic stem cells (cited as a "Top Ten Breakthrough" by Science in 2003), the generation of disease-specific pluripotent stem cells by direct reprogramming of human fibroblasts (cited in the "Breakthrough of the Year" issue of Science magazine in 2008), and demonstration of the role of the RNA-binding protein Lin28 in cancer and metabolic disease.

He has been elected a fellow of the American Association for the Advancement of Science and the American Academy of Arts and Sciences, and a member of the Institute of Medicine of the National Academies, American Society for Clinical Investigation, American Association of Physicians and American Pediatric Societies. Daley was an inaugural winner of the NIH Director's Pioneer Award (2004), which provides a five-year unrestricted grant to pursue highly innovative research, and received the Judson Daland Prize from the American Philosophical Society for achievement in patient-oriented research, the E. Mead Johnson Award from the American Pediatric Society for contributions to stem cell research, and the E. Donnall Thomas Prize from the American Society of Hematology for advances in induced pluripotent stem cell research, in addition to awards recognizing his contributions to medical research from the National Institutes of Health, the New England Cancer Society, Harvard Medical School, and the Leukemia and Lymphoma Society of America.  In addition to funding by the NIH, Dr. Daley's research has been supported by the National Science Foundation, Defense Advanced Research Projects Agency, American Cancer Society, Edward Mallinckrodt Jr. Foundation, Burroughs Wellcome Fund, Leukemia and Lymphoma Society of America, Roche Foundation for Anemia Research, Alex's Lemonade Stand, Ellison Medical Foundation, and Doris Duke Medical Foundation.

Daley has been prominent in advocating for ethical oversight of human stem cell research. On behalf of the International Society for Stem Cell Research (ISSCR), he chaired the special international task force that formulated the ISSCR Guidelines for Human Embryonic Stem Cell Research (2006) and as president of the ISSCR empaneled and served on the special task force that wrote the ISSCR Guidelines for Clinical Translation of Stem Cells (2008), which have served as a roadmap for advancing stem cell science into clinical trials. Dr. Daley has testified six times before committees of the United States Senate and United States House of Representatives to advocate for expanded governmental support for stem cell research. He has served on the scientific advisory board of the Massachusetts Life Sciences Center and on the editorial board of the journals Science, Cell, Cell Stem Cell, Stem Cells, and Blood.

References

Scientists from New York (state)
Harvard Medical School alumni
Massachusetts Institute of Technology School of Science alumni
Harvard Medical School faculty
Living people
Howard Hughes Medical Investigators
Fellows of the American Academy of Arts and Sciences
Year of birth missing (living people)
Place of birth missing (living people)
People from Boston
Fellows of the AACR Academy
Members of the National Academy of Medicine